Luca Gaudiano (born 3 December 1991), known simply as Gaudiano, is an Italian singer-songwriter.

He competed and won at the "Newcomers" section of the Sanremo Music Festival 2021, with the song "Polvere da sparo".

Discography

Studio albums 
 L'ultimo fiore (2022)

Singles 
 "Le cose inutili" (2020)
 "Acqua per occhi rossi" (2020)
 "Polvere da sparo" (2020)
 "Rimani" (2021)
 "Oltre le onde" (2022)
 "100 kg di piume" (2022)
 "L'ultimo fiore" (2022)

References

External links

1991 births
Living people
Italian male singer-songwriters
Italian pop singers
21st-century Italian  male singers
People from Foggia
Sanremo Music Festival winners of the newcomers section